The women's 10,000 metres event at the 2002 Asian Athletics Championships was held in Colombo, Sri Lanka on 10 August.

Results

References

2002 Asian Athletics Championships
10,000 metres at the Asian Athletics Championships
2002 in women's athletics